Kathleen Erin Phelan Stoody (born March 10, 1982, in North Vancouver, British Columbia) is a breaststroke swimmer from Canada, who won two medals (silver and bronze) at the 2003 Pan American Games in Santo Domingo, Dominican Republic.

References
 Swimming Canada

1982 births
Living people
Canadian female breaststroke swimmers
Swimmers at the 2003 Pan American Games
Sportspeople from British Columbia
Pan American Games silver medalists for Canada
Pan American Games medalists in swimming
Medalists at the 2003 Pan American Games
20th-century Canadian women
21st-century Canadian women